Shchuchinskiye Peski is a rural locality (a selo) and the administrative center of Shchuchinsko-Peskovskoye Rural Settlement, Ertilsky District, Voronezh Oblast, Russia. The population was 672 as of 2010. There are 10 streets.

Geography 
Shchuchinskiye Peski is located 24 km southwest of Ertil (the district's administrative centre) by road. Shchuchye is the nearest rural locality.

References 

Rural localities in Ertilsky District